Dr. Samuel Paul (11 April 1930 – 26 October 2015) was an Indian scholar, economist, former visiting professor at Harvard Business School, advisor to the World Bank and the UN Commission on Transnational Corporations,  and was  a professor and  the second director of the Indian Institute of Management Ahmedabad.

He served from 8 September 1972 to 30 June 1978. He also taught at the Kennedy School of Government and the Woodrow Wilson School of Public Affairs, Princeton University. Upon his return from Washington to India, he pioneered the creation of citizen report cards, a tool for social accountability. Later, he went on to be the founding chairperson of a new think tank, the Public Affairs Centre India that has taken his work forward. Other organisations that he helped launch are the Public Affairs Foundation, the Coalition Against Corruption and the Children's Movement for Civic Awareness. He had also been on the Boards of the State Bank of India and several international research centres. In recent years, his focus had been on public governance and related issues. He was the first Asian to be awarded the Jit Gill Memorial Award by the World Bank, in 2006. Paul was also the recipient of the Fred Riggs Award of the American Society of Public Administration, and the Nohria award of the All India Management Association. Government of India honoured him with Padma Shri in 2004.

Books:

Managerial Economics (co-author), McGraw Hill, 1977,
Managing Development Programs: Lessons of Success, Westview Press (USA), 1982,
Strategic Management of Development Programs, ILO, Geneva, 1984,
Corruption in India: Agenda For Action (co-author), Vision Books, Delhi, 1997,
Holding the State to Account, Books for Change, Bangalore, 2002,
Who Benefits from India's Public Services (co-author), Academic Foundation, Delhi, 2006,
The State of Our Cities (co-author), Oxford University Press, 2012,
A Life and Its Lessons (Memoirs), PAC, Bangalore, 2012,
Fighting Corruption: The Way Forward, Academic Foundation, Delhi, 2013. The Paradox of India's North South Divide (co-author), Sage, Delhi, 2015.

References

1930 births
2015 deaths
20th-century Indian educational theorists
Indian independence activists from Kerala
Academic staff of the Indian Institute of Management Ahmedabad
Recipients of the Padma Shri in literature & education
Scholars from Kerala
20th-century Indian economists
People from Pathanamthitta district